Connecticut elected its members September 16, 1816.

See also 
 Connecticut's at-large congressional district special election, 1817
 United States House of Representatives elections, 1816 and 1817
 List of United States representatives from Connecticut

1816
Connecticut
United States House of Representatives